Cordova is a town in Orangeburg County, South Carolina, United States. The population was 169 at the 2010 census.

Geography
Cordova is located at 33°26′N 80°55′W  (33.4348,-80.9201).

Demographics

As of the census of 2000, there were 157 people, 59 households, and 47 families residing in the town. The population density was 347.0 people per square mile (134.7/km2). There were 64 housing units at an average density of 141.5 per square mile (54.9/km2). The racial makeup of the town was 97.45% White, 1.27% African American, and 1.27% from two or more races.

There were 59 households, out of which 49.2% had children under the age of 18 living with them, 62.7% were married couples living together, 15.3% had a female householder with no husband present, and 20.3% were non-families. 20.3% of all households were made up of individuals, and 11.9% had someone living alone who was 65 years of age or older. The average household size was 2.66 and the average family size was 3.06.

In the town, the population was spread out, with 29.3% under the age of 18, 8.9% from 18 to 24, 29.9% from 25 to 44, 21.0% from 45 to 64, and 10.8% who were 65 years of age or older. The median age was 30 years. For every 100 females, there were 74.4 males. For every 100 females age 18 and over, there were 82.0 males.

The median income for a household in the town was $43,125, and the median income for a family was $46,875. Males had a median income of $36,750 versus $25,000 for females. The per capita income for the town was $18,332. About 15.8% of families and 18.2% of the population were below the poverty line, including 26.2% of those under the age of eighteen and none of those 65 or over.

References

External links
Government Information on Town of Cordova

Towns in Orangeburg County, South Carolina
Towns in South Carolina